Rozier Glacier is a glacier flowing between Pishtachev Peak and Balis Ridge into Wilhelmina Bay north of Sophie Cliff, on the west coast of Graham Land, Antarctica. Charted by the Belgian Antarctic Expedition under Gerlache, 1897–99. Named by the United Kingdom Antarctic Place-Names Committee (UK-APC) in 1960 for Jean-François Pilâtre de Rozier (1756–1785), French technician who made the first human balloon ascent and (with the Marquis d'Arlandes) the first balloon voyage, in 1783.

Glaciers of Danco Coast